The 248th Coast Artillery Regiment was a Coast Artillery Corps regiment in the Washington National Guard. Including its predecessor battalion, it garrisoned the Harbor Defenses of Puget Sound (HD Puget Sound), Washington 1924–1944.

History
The 248th Coast Artillery was organized as a battalion 1 May 1924 as the Washington National Guard component of the Harbor Defenses of Puget Sound (HD Puget Sound), Washington. The 14th Coast Artillery was the Regular Army component of those defenses. The 248th's primary armory was in Tacoma, Washington. In May 1944 the regiment was inactivated.

Organized as a battalion 1 May 1924 by redesignating the 1st Battalion, 248th Artillery, Coast Artillery Corps, Washington National Guard as the 1st Battalion, 248th Coast Artillery (Harbor Defense) (HD). Redesignated as the 248th Coast Artillery (HD) Battalion 1 October 1933. Expanded to a regiment and redesignated as the 248th Coast Artillery (HD) Regiment 1 September 1935.

On 16 September 1940 the regiment was inducted into federal service at Tacoma, Washington and moved to Fort Worden in HD Puget Sound 23 September 1940. On induction the unit was filled out by redesignating Washington National Guard elements of the 148th Field Artillery Regiment, which made up over half of the 248th.

On 25 April 1944 the regiment moved to Camp Barkeley, Texas where inactivated 8 May 1944.

See also
 Seacoast defense in the United States
 United States Army Coast Artillery Corps
 Harbor Defense Command

References

Bibliography
 
 Gaines, William C., Historical Sketches Coast Artillery Regiments 1917-1950, National Guard Army Regiments 197-265
 Gaines, William C., Coast Artillery Organizational History, 1917-1950, Coast Defense Journal, vol. 23, issue 2 (Regular Army regiments)

External links
 Historical sketches of 205th CA (AA) and 248th CA (HD) at Washington Military Dept website
 Map of Harbor Defenses of Puget Sound at FortWiki.com
 Harbor Defenses of Puget Sound at the Coast Defense Study Group website

Coast artillery regiments of the United States Army
Military units and formations in Washington (state)
Military units and formations established in 1924
Military units and formations disestablished in 1944
1924 establishments in Washington (state)
1944 disestablishments in Texas